Six ships of the British Royal Navy have been named HMS Marigold, after the marigold flower:

 , a 22-gun ship captured from the Portuguese in 1650 and sold 1658
 Marigold, a 3-gun hoy, a 42-ton vessel built at Portsmouth Dockyard in 1653 and broken up in 1712
 , a 4-gun fireship purchased in 1673 and lost in action in August of that year
 , a 44-gun fourth rate captured from Algeria in 1677 and wrecked 1679
 , an  sloop launched in 1915 and sold 1920
 , a  launched in 1940 and sunk December 1942

Royal Navy ship names